This is the results breakdown of the local elections held in Andalusia on 13 June 1999. The following tables show detailed results in the autonomous community's most populous municipalities, sorted alphabetically.

Overall

City control
The following table lists party control in the most populous municipalities, including provincial capitals (shown in bold). Gains for a party are displayed with the cell's background shaded in that party's colour.

Municipalities

Alcalá de Guadaíra
Population: 56,244

Algeciras
Population: 101,972

Almería
Population: 168,025

Antequera
Population: 40,239

Benalmádena
Population: 28,479

Cádiz
Population: 143,129

Chiclana de la Frontera
Population: 55,494

Córdoba
Population: 309,961

Dos Hermanas
Population: 92,506

Écija
Population: 37,113

El Ejido
Population: 50,170

El Puerto de Santa María
Population: 73,728

Fuengirola
Population: 44,924

Granada
Population: 241,471

Huelva
Population: 139,991

Jaén
Population: 107,184

Jerez de la Frontera
Population: 181,602

La Línea de la Concepción
Population: 59,629

Linares
Population: 58,410

Málaga
Population: 528,079

Marbella
Population: 98,377

Morón de la Frontera
Population: 28,232

Motril
Population: 50,025

Ronda
Population: 33,806

San Fernando
Population: 84,014

Sanlúcar de Barrameda
Population: 61,382

Seville

Population: 701,927

Utrera
Population: 45,947

Vélez-Málaga
Population: 53,816

References

Andalusia
1999